Quaternary International is a peer-reviewed scientific journal on quaternary science published by Elsevier on behalf of the International Union for Quaternary Research. The journal was established in 1989 and covers full spectrum of the physical and natural sciences that are commonly employed in solving problems related to the quaternary period. The editor-in-chief is Min-Te Chen (National Taiwan Ocean University). 

According to the 2017 Journal Citation Reports, the journal has a 2016 impact factor of 2.199.

References

External links 
 

Quaternary science journals
English-language journals
Elsevier academic journals
Publications established in 1989
Journals published between 27 and 51 times per year
Academic journals associated with learned and professional societies